The 2004 UNLV Rebels football team represented the University of Nevada, Las Vegas during the 2004 NCAA Division I-A football season. UNLV competed as a member of the Mountain West Conference (MW) and played their home games at Sam Boyd Stadium in Whitney, Nevada. They were coached by John Robinson, who resigned as head coach at the end of the season.

Schedule

Roster

References

UNLV
UNLV Rebels football seasons
UNLV Rebels football